Bertrand Nigel Bosworth-Smith CSI (20 June 1873 – 19 February 1947) was a British administrator in India and English cricketer. 

Born at Harrow, Bosworth-Smith was educated at Harrow School, before attending Magdalen College, Oxford. While attending Oxford, Bosworth-Smith made his debut in first-class cricket for Oxford University in 1895, playing once for the university that year against the Marylebone Cricket Club (MCC). He also made what would be his only first-class appearance for Middlesex in 1895, playing against Nottinghamshire in the County Championship. He played twice more for Oxford University in 1896, graduating in 1897 a Bachelor of Arts (B.A.). He played in two first-class matches for the Marylebone Cricket Club in 1897 against county opposition, with both matches played at Lord's.

He was appointed to the Indian Civil Service, which saw his appointment as an Assistant Commissioner in the Punjab. He played two first-class matches while in India for the Europeans cricket team in the Bombay Presidency against the Parsees in August and September 1900. Bosworth-Smith had returned home to England by 1901, where he made two further first-class appearances for the MCC at Lord's. Returning to India, his final appearance in first-class cricket came for the Gentlemen of India against a touring Oxford University Authentics team in 1903. He would later play for Dorset in a Minor Counties Championship match in 1909.

He was married to Mary Constance Bett in June 1912, later divorcing. He was a Companion to the Order of the Star of India for his service in the Indian Civil Service. He died at Hove, Sussex on 19 February 1947. His uncle, Archie Wickham, was also a first-class cricketer.

References

External links
Bertrand Bosworth-Smith at ESPNcricinfo

1873 births
1947 deaths
People from Harrow, London
People educated at Harrow School
Alumni of Magdalen College, Oxford
English cricketers
Oxford University cricketers
Middlesex cricketers
Marylebone Cricket Club cricketers
Europeans cricketers
Dorset cricketers
Indian Civil Service (British India) officers
Companions of the Order of the Star of India